Ababiya Abajobir is the founding member of the separatist organization Oromo Liberation Front (OLF). He served the OLF in many leading positions, including as Head of OLF's Foreign Affairs in Washington from 2000 to 2003.

Background
A grandson of Abba Jifar II, last Moti of the Kingdom of Jimma, in what is now the region of Oromia in southern Ethiopia, Ababiya Abajobir had served as head of OLF for many years. He had been imprisoned for ten years when the military regime was in power (1974–91).

During the transitional government (1991–95) when the OLF joined the Ethiopian government, he was assigned as Ethiopia's ambassador to Egypt. He served OLF in several positions after the organization left the government complaining about harassment by the Oromo Peoples' Democratic Organization (OPDO) and the TPLF-led government. In 2000, he became the leader of OLF's Foreign Affairs in Washington D.C., but he resigned in 2003 to try to bring peace between OLF and the government of Ethiopia.

In 2008, he said the question of Oromo people have been answered, hinting there is no need for the OLF's armed movement anymore since it can work in the Ethiopian framework to improve the condition of Oromos. He said armed struggle of the OLF is outdated and unnecessary.

See also
Oromo people
Ethiopian People's Revolutionary Democratic Front

References

Oromo people
Year of birth missing (living people)
Living people
Ambassadors of Ethiopia to Egypt
People from Oromia Region
Oromo Liberation Front politicians